Rainer Eppelmann (born 12 February 1943 in Berlin), is a German politician. Known for his opposition in the German Democratic Republic, he became Minister for Disarmament and Defense in the last cabinet. He is now a member of the CDU.

The erection of the Berlin Wall forced him to drop out of the school he had attended in West Berlin in 1961 and he was forbidden from taking his Abitur exams in the East for refusing to join the Free German Youth movement. He then worked as an assistant to a roofer before doing a job training for bricklayer. He is a pacifist. In 1966, for refusing both regular service and Bausoldat (construction soldier in the National People's Army), he was brutally beaten and arrested by the Stasi, and put into prison for eight months where he was starved, tortured, abused and interrogated.

Later, he studied Theology at the theological school in Berlin, an education he completed in 1974 with two exams. He then worked as a Lutheran pastor in Berlin-Friedrichshain and took part in the opposition, such as being the  editor of samizdat publications with Thomas Welz. It has been claimed that during this period Eppelmann had contact with the CIA.

In 1990, Eppelmann was one of the founding fathers of the Democratic Awakening, becoming its president. Thus, he took an active part in the round table of 1990, preparing the German reunification. From 18 March 1990 to 2 October 1990 (when it ceased to exist) he was a member of the Volkskammer. He was Minister for Disarmament and Defence of East Germany in the cabinet of Hans Modrow and later in the one of Lothar de Maizière. When the Democratic Awakening joined the Christian Democratic Union in August 1990, Eppelmann became a member and, later, the assisting chairman of the worker's division of the CDU, the CDA.

He was a member of the Bundestag from 1990 to 2005 for the Christian Democratic Union. Then, he was chairman of the commission that coped with the history of the German Democratic Republic.

Eppelmann's trademark is his "Berliner Schnauze", an idiom that is supposed to bring him close to the people of Berlin.

He is married and has five children.

See also
Democratic Awakening
German reunification

References

Both retrieved January 2, 2007

External links
 http://www.dhm.de/lemo/html/biografien/EppelmannRainer/
 https://web.archive.org/web/20070702070013/http://www.bundestag.de/mdb/mdb15/bio/E/eppelra0.html

1943 births
Living people
People from East Berlin
East German dissidents
Lutheran pacifists
Members of the Bundestag for Brandenburg
Members of the Bundestag 2002–2005
Members of the Bundestag 1998–2002
Members of the Bundestag 1994–1998
Members of the Bundestag for the Christian Democratic Union of Germany
Ministers of National Defence (East Germany)
Members of the 10th Volkskammer
German reunification
Commanders Crosses of the Order of Merit of the Federal Republic of Germany